The Russian invasion of Finland may refer to:

 Russo-Swedish War (1495–1497)
 Finnish War (1808-1809)
 Winter War (1939-1940)
 Continuation War (1941-1944)

See also
 List of wars between Russia and Sweden